The Struve Railroad Bridge, was the first all-metal railroad bridge over the Dnieper that existed from 1855 to 1920 in Kyiv. The bridge was one of the longest in the empire, yielding in length only to the bridges in Syzran and Yekaterinoslav.

History
It was the second stationary bridge over Dnieper with the construction supervision conducted personally by Amand Struve. This railroad truss bridge was initially named after its constructor, engineer Struve. Standing on 13 piers, it consisted of dozen 292-feet-long sections resulting in size of some 480 sazhens (1440 fathoms). During the construction Struve first in the Russian Empire used caisson method to lay the foundation. For its construction was used 243 pood of iron (3,000 tonnes). Each of the sections were tested to hold 18,000 pood. The total cost of the project round-up to be 3,200 thousands rubles. For the construction of the bridge Captain Struve was promoted to Colonel. During this period of time (1860s-1870s) Struve was involved in various other construction projects as well, such as the installation and improvement of the city's utilities network.

On February 17, 1870 the first train by the Kyiv-Kursk Railways company crossed the bridge to the Kyiv railroad station. However the constant traffic was officially opened on April 4, 1870 after the consecration of the bridge. Similarly to the Nicholas Chain Bridge, the Struve Bridge survived the Great and Civil wars and was blown up in 1920 by the retreating Polish troops (see: Kiev Offensive).

Today next to the former Struve's bridge stands the newly built Darnytsia Railroad Bridge.

See also
 Bridges in Kyiv

Bibliography
Rybakov, M.O. Unknown and not-well-known pages of the Kiev's history. "Kyi". Kiev, 1997.
Anisimov, A. Sad ignorance. "Tabachuk Ltd." Kiev, 1992.

External links 

 Bridge profile at wek.kiev.ua
 Struve's biography in Mirror Weekly

Demolished bridges in Ukraine
Railroad bridges in Kyiv
Bridges completed in 1870
Demolished buildings and structures in Kyiv
Former railway bridges in Ukraine
Southwestern Railways
1870 establishments in Ukraine